The following are the Pulitzer Prizes for 1919.

Journalism awards
Public Service:
Milwaukee Journal, for its strong and courageous campaign for Americanism in a constituency where foreign elements made such a policy hazardous from a business point of view.

Letters and Drama Awards
Novel:
The Magnificent Ambersons by Booth Tarkington (Doubleday)
Biography or Autobiography:
The Education of Henry Adams by Henry Adams (Houghton)

Special Citations and Awards
These awards were made possible by a special grant from The Poetry Society.

Poetry:
Cornhuskers by Carl Sandburg (Holt)
Old Road to Paradise by Margaret Widdemer (Holt)

References

External links

Pulitzer Prizes by year
Pulitzer Prize
Pulitzer Prize